Turmeric (Curcuma longa) is a rhizomatous herbaceous plant used as a spice.

Turmeric may also refer to:

Related plants
 Black turmeric (Curcuma caesia)
 Narrow-leaved turmeric (Curcuma angustifolia)
 Tree turmeric (Berberis aristata)
 White turmeric (Curcuma zedoaria)
 Wild turmeric (Curcuma aromatica)

Arts, entertainment, and media
 Turmeric (album), a box set album by the Japanese noise musician Merzbow

Food and drinks
 Turmeric juice
 Turmeric milk
 Turmeric tea